Duvensee is a municipality in the district of Lauenburg, in Schleswig-Holstein, Germany. It is most well-known for its Mesolithic archaeologic sites located in the Duvensee Bog, which have helped in the discovery of diets and settlement strategies of European post-glacial hunter gatherers. The Duvensee paddle was also discovered there in 1926.

References

Municipalities in Schleswig-Holstein
Herzogtum Lauenburg